Paul Edward Vincent Evans (born February 24, 1955) is a Canadian former professional ice hockey player. He played 11 games in the National Hockey League with the Toronto Maple Leafs during the 1976–77 and 1977–78 seasons. The rest of his career, which lasted from 1975 to 1979, was spent in the minor leagues. He was born in Peterborough, Ontario, and is the brother of two other NHL hockey players, Doug Evans and Kevin Evans.

Early life 
As a child, Paul Evans was a gifted athlete, winning his teams championships in hockey, softball, and lacrosse.

Hockey career
Paul Evans played for the Peterborough Petes from 1971 to 1975. In 1971, he played in the Memorial Cup finals. In 1973, he joined his team in a trip to the Soviet Union.

Paul Evans was drafted into both the National Hockey League and the World Hockey Association in 1975. The Toronto Maple Leafs took him in round 9, 149th overall in the 1975 NHL Amateur Draft, while the Indianapolis Racers took him in round 13, 162nd overall in the 1975 WHA Amateur Draft.

Despite being drafted into both major leagues, he never played in the WHA, only in the NHL. He played a total of 11 games over two seasons, 1976–77 and 1977–78, in the NHL, all for the Toronto Maple Leafs. He scored one goal and had two points.

Lacrosse career 
During the hockey off-season of his major junior years, he played professional lacrosse. From 1972 to 1975, he joined four teams that were vying for the Minto Cup. He also played in four lacrosse teams vying for the Mann Cup in 1978, 1980, 1982 and 1984. 

After his retirement from professional sports, Evans became a lacrosse coach in his hometown of Peterborough for 17 years. As a coach, his team won the Minto Cup once.

Career statistics

Regular season and playoffs

International

External links

References 

1955 births
Living people
Canadian expatriate ice hockey players in the United States
Canadian ice hockey right wingers
Dallas Black Hawks players
Flint Generals (IHL) players
Ice hockey people from Ontario
Indianapolis Racers draft picks
Oklahoma City Blazers (1965–1977) players
Peterborough Petes (ice hockey) players
Saginaw Gears players
Sportspeople from Peterborough, Ontario
Toronto Maple Leafs draft picks
Toronto Maple Leafs players